Barterville is an unincorporated community in Nicholas County, in the U.S. state of Kentucky.

History
A post office was established at Barterville in 1879, and remained in operation until 1973. The name most likely refers to deals made in the community through the exchange of goods.

References

Unincorporated communities in Nicholas County, Kentucky
Unincorporated communities in Kentucky